Grieg is a crater on Mercury. It has a diameter of 59 kilometers. Its name was adopted by the International Astronomical Union (IAU) in 1985. Grieg is named after the Norwegian composer Edvard Grieg, who lived from 1843 to 1907.

Grieg lies within a part of the Borealis Planitia.  To the west of it is Sor Juana crater, and to the southeast is Monet.  To  the north is Abedin.

References

Impact craters on Mercury
Crater